Evelyn Alexandra Lozada (born December 10, 1975) is an American television personality, model, and spokesperson. Lozada is best known as one of the six main cast members in the VH1 reality series Basketball Wives throughout its run beginning in 2010.

Early life 
Lozada was born in Brooklyn and raised in The Bronx to Nengo Lozada and Sylvia Ferrera. Lozada was raised with her sister by her mother. Lozada is of Puerto Rican ancestry. She moved to Miami in 2007. She worked as a secretary to an entertainment attorney, and later became co-owner of Dulce, a shoe boutique located in Coral Gables, Florida. Lozada was raised as a Roman Catholic.

Career

Television 
Lozada starred in Basketball Wives, an American reality television series franchise on VH1 for nine seasons. Another reality television show, Ev and Ocho, which had been planned to follow the lives of her and former husband Chad Johnson, never aired. Lozada is the center of a third reality television series, Livin' Lozada, with her daughter, Shaniece. In September 2012, Lozada appeared on the television show Iyanla: Fix My Life where she discussed her personal life and sought emotional healing with Iyanla Vanzant.

Books 
Lozada and her brand strategist, Courtney Parker, wrote the 2012 novel The Wives Association: Inner Circle. Released by Cash Money Content books, the novel follows a young woman who marries a football star and then forms a group of other sports wives - The Wives Association. In 2019, Lozada published the novel, The Perfect Date which was co-written with Holly Lorincz. In 2020, Lozada is scheduled to publish another novel co-written with Holly Lorincz entitled The Wrong Mr. Darcy.

Activism 
In December 2012, Lozada posed for PETA's "I'd Rather Go Naked than Wear Fur" campaign. In September 2017, Lozada launched the Turn Hurt Into Joy online campaign to raise money for domestic violence and sexual assault survivors.

Personal life
Lozada has a daughter, Shaniece Virginia Sabina Hairston (b. 1993), from a previous relationship with Jamal Hairston. Lozada was engaged to NBA player Antoine Walker, with whom she had a ten-year relationship, from 1998 until 2008.
Lozada began dating MLB player Carl Crawford in 2013. In December 2013, Lozada and Crawford announced their engagement. Lozada gave birth to their son, Carl Leo Crawford on March 22, 2014. In August 2017, Lozada and Crawford called off the engagement.

Marriage to Chad Johnson
On July 4, 2012, Lozada married Chad Johnson (whose name was Chad Ochocinco at that time) in Saint Martin, after a two-year engagement. On August 11, 2012, Johnson was arrested on a charge of domestic battery against Lozada according to Davie, Florida police. On August 14, 2012, Lozada filed for divorce claiming that her marriage was “irretrievably broken”. Their divorce was finalized on September 19, 2012. On September 21, 2012, Johnson entered a plea of no contest to a charge of misdemeanor domestic battery, avoiding jail time in an agreement with prosecutors and Lozada, Johnson received a year of probation.

References

External links

1975 births
Living people
American people of Puerto Rican descent
Participants in American reality television series
People from Brooklyn
People from the Bronx
People from Miami
Basketball players' wives and girlfriends